Petr Evgenyevich Yan (born 11 February 1993) is a Russian professional mixed martial artist. He currently competes in the Bantamweight division in the Ultimate Fighting Championship (UFC), where he is a former UFC Bantamweight Champion. Yan formerly fought in Absolute Championship Berkut where he is a former ACB Bantamweight Champion. As of March 13, 2023, he is #4 in the UFC bantamweight rankings.

Early life
Yan was born to a father of mixed Chinese-Georgian descent and a Russian mother. In sixth grade, Yan began training in ITF Taekwon-do and often fought in the streets and at the school in his area, so his family often moved to try and prevent this. Yan's older brother trained in boxing in the city of Dudinka, Krasnoyarsk Krai, and Petr wanted to learn how to box too. But his elder brother initially refused to take Petr along with him, thus Petr decided to sneak and follow his brother to go to learn the sport of boxing. From then on, Petr went on to train in boxing for 8 years and achieved the rank of Master of Sport in Boxing in the 64 kg weight category. Petr Yan also graduated from the Siberian Federal University in the city of Omsk with a degree in Physical Culture and Sport.

Mixed martial arts career

Early career
Yan debuted in MMA at the Eurasian Fighting Championship - Baikal Fight in December 2014. He won via third-round knockout over Murad Bakiev, who was also a debutant. In 2015, Yan signed a contract with the Russian promotion Absolute Championship Berkut. He was said to have gained many fans after his debut with the promotion where he fought Brazilian fighter Renato Velame, who at the time, already had 26 fights in his MMA career. However, Yan won this fight by decision. In Yan's third fight, he fought and beat Kharon Orzumiev by first-round submission in just 47 seconds. In his following fight, Yan knocked out Artur Mirzakhanyan in the first round which was held at Professional Fight Night 10: Russia Cup.

Absolute Championship Berkut
On 24 October 2015, Yan faced Murad Kalamov and won the fight by unanimous decision. The win granted Yan the opportunity to fight Magomed Magomedov for the championship belt in the bantamweight division.

Yan fought Magomed Magomedov on 26 March 2016 in Moscow at ACB 32: "The Battle of Lions". After going all five rounds, Magomedov won the fight by split decision and won the title at bantamweight; however, many felt that Yan had won the fight, including ACB president, Mairbek Khasiev who promised to book a rematch. Although Yan lost, this fight was voted as ACB's best fight of the year in 2016.

Following his first professional loss, Yan returned to face English mixed martial artist Ed Arthur at ACB 41: Path to Triumph, in Sochi. He won the fight by unanimous decision.

In the spring of 2017, Yan was scheduled to have a rematch with Magomed Magomedov on 15 April at ACB 57: Payback in Moscow. This time, Yan exacted revenge and defeated Magomedov by unanimous decision after fighting all five hard-fought rounds.  He won the decision and ultimately was crowned the ACB bantamweight champion.

Following his win, Yan returned in September 2017 to fight Brazilian contender Matheus Mattos at ACB: 71 in Moscow.  After winning the first two rounds, Yan caught Mattos with a left uppercut which caused Mattos to fall to his back, making the referee stop the fight. He successfully defended his bantamweight title by third-round knockout.

Ultimate Fighting Championship
Following his first title defense, Yan signed a contract with the Ultimate Fighting Championship in January 2018.

Yan made his promotional debut against Teruto Ishihara on 23 June 2018 at UFC Fight Night 132. He won the fight via technical knockout in the first round.

Yan was briefly scheduled to face top-14 UFC rankings Douglas Silva de Andrade on 15 September 2018 at the UFC Fight Night 136. However, Andrade pulled out of the fight on 9 August citing a foot injury, and he was replaced by Jin Soo Son. At weigh-ins, Son weighed one pound over the bantamweight non-title fight limit of 136 pounds and he was fined 20 percent of his purse to Yan. Yan won the fight by unanimous decision. This win earned him the Fight of the Night award.

A bantamweight bout was rescheduled between Yan and Douglas Silva de Andrade for UFC 232 on 29 December 2018. He won the fight via technical knockout in round two after de Andrade's corner stopped the fight.

On 10 January 2019, Yan revealed on social media that he had signed a new, four-fight contract with the UFC. Yan faced John Dodson on 23 February 2019 at UFC Fight Night 145. Yan won the fight by unanimous decision, after landing hard punches and kicks whilst Dodson's back was against the cage.

Despite his previous, few months old contract, Yan signed a new six-fight contract which was offered to him immediately after his win against Dodson.

Yan faced Jimmie Rivera on 8 June 2019 at UFC 238. He won the fight by unanimous decision.

On 26 June, it was reported that Yan had to undergo surgery due to synovitis in his left elbow.

Yan faced Urijah Faber on 14 December 2019 at UFC 245. After largely dominating the striking exchanges and knocking Faber down in the second round, Yan ultimately won the fight via knockout in the third round. This win earned him the Performance of the Night award.

After the fight with Faber, Yan was critical of bantamweight champion, Henry Cejudo, stating that he is being ducked by Cejudo. “I think it’s pretty obvious he is ducking me and doing everything he can to avoid fighting me. All this talk about him wanting a bigger name is bullshit, he just wants easier fight for himself."

Bantamweight Championship 
After Cejudo's title defense against Dominick Cruz at UFC 249, Cejudo announced he would be retiring from mixed martial arts competition vacating the UFC Bantamweight Championship. Yan then faced former WEC and UFC Featherweight Champion José Aldo for the vacant title on 12 July 2020 at UFC 251. He won the fight via technical knockout in the fifth round.

Yan was expected to make his first title defense against Aljamain Sterling on 12 December 2020 at UFC 256. However, it was announced on 22 November that the bout was cancelled from the UFC 256 card and the bout was rescheduled on 6 March 2021 at UFC 259. Yan lost the fight by disqualification in the fourth round due to an illegal knee, losing the UFC Bantamweight Championship. Two judges had Yan up 29-28 and one had Sterling up 29-28 before the illegal knee.

A rematch with Sterling was expected to take place on 30 October 2021 at UFC 267. However, on 25 September, Sterling withdrew from the contest due to lingering neck issues. Cory Sandhagen stepped in as replacement with the bout being for the Interim UFC Bantamweight Championship. Yan won the bout via unanimous decision. This bout earned the Fight of the Night award.

A title unification rematch with Aljamain Sterling was scheduled to take place on 5 March 2022 at UFC 272. However, on 11 January 2022, it was announced that the bout was pushed back to UFC 273 on 9 April. Yan lost the bout via a split decision. The fight also earned him third place in the "Fan Bonus of the Night" award.

Yan faced Sean O’Malley on 22 October 2022 at UFC 280. He lost the bout via split decision. The decision was seen as highly controversial with many fans and fighters adamantly expressing their belief that Yan was the rightful winner. 25 out of 26 media outlets scored the bout in favor of Yan. The bout received the Fight of the Night bonus.

Yan faced Merab Dvalishvili on March 11, 2023 at UFC Fight Night: Yan vs. Dvalishvili. He lost the fight via unanimous decision.

Personal life
Yan and his wife have two sons. During Russia's 2022 invasion of Ukraine, Yan posted an image on social media of the countries' flags and a dove of peace.

Championships and accomplishments

Mixed martial arts
Ultimate Fighting Championship
UFC Bantamweight Championship (One time)
Interim UFC Bantamweight Championship (One time)
Fight of the Night (Three times) 
Performance of the Night (One time) 
Tied for second longest win streak in UFC Bantamweight division history (7)
Tied (Marlon Vera) for most knockdowns in UFC Bantamweight division history (10)
Crypto.com 
Fan Bonus of the Night 
Absolute Championship Berkut
ACB Bantamweight Championship (One time)
 One successful title defense
ACB Bantamweight Grand Prix 2015 Champion
MMADNA.nl
2018 European Newcomer of the Year

Mixed martial arts record

|-
|Loss
|align=center|16–5
|Merab Dvalishvili
|Decision (unanimous)
|UFC Fight Night: Yan vs. Dvalishvili
|
|align=center|5
|align=center|5:00
|Las Vegas, Nevada, United States
|
|-
|Loss
|align=center|16–4
|Sean O'Malley
|Decision (split)
|UFC 280
|
|align=center|3
|align=center|5:00
|Abu Dhabi, United Arab Emirates
|
|-
|Loss
|align=center|16–3
|Aljamain Sterling
|Decision (split)
|UFC 273
|
|align=center|5
|align=center|5:00
|Jacksonville, Florida, United States
|
|-
|Win
|align=center|16–2
|Cory Sandhagen 
|Decision (unanimous)
|UFC 267 
|
|align=center|5
|align=center|5:00
|Abu Dhabi, United Arab Emirates
|
|-
|Loss
|align=center|15–2
|Aljamain Sterling
|DQ (illegal knee) 
|UFC 259
|
|align=center|4
|align=center|4:29
|Las Vegas, Nevada, United States
|
|-
|Win
|align=center|15–1
|José Aldo
|TKO (punches)
|UFC 251 
|
|align=center|5
|align=center|3:24
|Abu Dhabi, United Arab Emirates
|
|-
|Win
|align=center|14–1
|Urijah Faber
|KO (head kick)
|UFC 245 
|
|align=center|3
|align=center|0:43
|Las Vegas, Nevada, United States
|
|-
|Win
|align=center|13–1
|Jimmie Rivera
|Decision (unanimous)
|UFC 238 
|
|align=center|3
|align=center|5:00
|Chicago, Illinois, United States
|
|-
|Win
|align=center|12–1
|John Dodson
|Decision (unanimous)
|UFC Fight Night: Błachowicz vs. Santos 
|
|align=center|3
|align=center|5:00
|Prague, Czech Republic
|
|-
|Win
|align=center|11–1
|Douglas Silva de Andrade
|TKO (corner stoppage)
|UFC 232 
|
|align=center|2
|align=center|5:00
|Inglewood, California, United States
|  
|-
|Win
|align=center|10–1
|Son Jin-soo
|Decision (unanimous)
|UFC Fight Night: Hunt vs. Oleinik 
|
|align=center|3
|align=center|5:00
|Moscow, Russia
|
|-
|Win
|align=center|9–1
|Teruto Ishihara
|KO (punches)
|UFC Fight Night: Cowboy vs. Edwards
|
|align=center|1
|align=center|3:28
|Kallang, Singapore
|
|-
|Win
|align=center|8–1
|Matheus Mattos
|TKO (punches)
|ACB 71
|
|align=center|3
|align=center|2:27
|Moscow, Russia
|
|-
|Win
|align=center|7–1
|Magomed Magomedov
|Decision (unanimous)
|ACB 57
|
|align=center|5
|align=center|5:00
|Moscow, Russia
|
|-
|Win
|align=center|6–1
|Ed Arthur
|Decision (unanimous)
|ACB 41
|
|align=center|3
|align=center|5:00
|Sochi, Russia
|
|-
|Loss
|align=center|5–1
|Magomed Magomedov
|Decision (split)
|ACB 32
|
|align=center|5
|align=center|5:00
|Moscow, Russia
|
|-
|Win
|align=center|5–0
|Murad Kalamov
|Decision (unanimous)
|ACB 24
|
|align=center|3
|align=center|5:00
|Moscow, Russia
|
|-
|Win
|align=center|4–0
|Artur Mirzakhanyan
|TKO (punches)
|Professional Fight Night 10: Russia Cup
|
|align=center|1
|align=center|2:40
|Omsk, Russia
|
|-
|Win
|align=center|3–0
|Kharon Orzumiev 
|Submission (guillotine  choke)
|ACB 19
|
|align=center|1
|align=center|0:47
|Kaliningrad, Russia
|
|-
|Win
|align=center|2–0
|Renato Velame
|Decision (unanimous)
|ACB 14
|
|align=center|3
|align=center|5:00
|Grozny, Russia
|
|-
|Win
|align=center|1–0
|Murad Bakiev
|KO (punch) 
|Siberian League: Baikal Cup 2014
|
|align=center|3
|align=center|0:45
|Irkutsk, Russia
|

See also
 List of current UFC fighters
 List of male mixed martial artists

References

External links
 
 

Russian male mixed martial artists
Mixed martial artists utilizing boxing
Mixed martial artists utilizing Brazilian jiu-jitsu
Russian practitioners of Brazilian jiu-jitsu
1993 births
Living people
Russian sportspeople of Chinese descent
Russian sportspeople of Georgian descent
People from Krasnoyarsk Krai
Ultimate Fighting Championship male fighters
Ultimate Fighting Championship champions
Russian activists against the 2022 Russian invasion of Ukraine
Sportspeople from Krasnoyarsk Krai